Kasten-brust armour ( — "box-shaped breast") — is a German form of plate armour from the first half of 15th century.

Kasten-brust armour was a style of early gothic armour widely used in the Holy Roman Empire. Typical harness construction consists of: a grand-bascinet helm or a bicoque hemet, box-shaped cuirass, gauntlets with a long cuff and a rectangular cutout and a plate skirt or padded garment known as a wappenrock. Only three verified breastplates are known to have survived until today and are housed in Kelvingrove Museum in Glasgow, the MET in New York, and Rathaus Museum of Vienna. Kasten-brust armour is however widely represented by paintings and statues of the first half of the 15th century.

Gallery

External links
 Living History Library entry for Kastenbrust armour (cached version)
 Replica with detailed fotos

References 
Osprey-Military "German Medieval Armies 1300-1500" (Men-at-Arms Series t166), text by Christopher Gravett, colour plates by Angus McBride, editor Martin Windrow, Reed International Books Ltd.,  "

Medieval armour
Western plate armour